The Let Rock Rule Tour was a concert tour by American hard rock band Aerosmith that featured Slash (with Myles Kennedy and the Conspirators) as the opening act. The tour sent both acts to various locations across North America from July to September 2014 and included two festival concerts and eighteen regular concerts. In addition, Aerosmith performed a private show in the middle of the tour. Slash with Myles Kennedy & the Conspirators did not perform at Rock Fest in Wisconsin or at the private show, but performed at all of the other concerts.

Full details of the concert tour were announced on April 8, 2014 in an interview with Steven Tyler and Joe Perry on On Air with Ryan Seacrest and through the launch of a new version of the band's website. To promote the tour, the band played a brief concert with Slash at the Whisky a Go Go on the Sunset Strip in West Hollywood, California. Tyler and Perry also appeared on The Ellen DeGeneres Show where they gave away tickets to the studio audience.

The concert tour followed Aerosmith's Global Warming Tour which saw the band play 88 concerts on five continents from 2012 to 2014 in support of their 2012 album Music from Another Dimension!.

Tour dates

Setlist
An average setlist would look like this:
"Back in the Saddle" (not performed at shows in Dana Point, Stateline, George, Denver, or Dallas; replaced with "Train Kept A-Rollin'" at shows in Atlanta, Atlantic City, Newark, Bristow, and Clarkston)
"Eat the Rich" (moved after "Love in an Elevator" at shows after Stateline; moved back to this slot for shows in Atlantic City, Newark, Bristow, and Clarkston; not performed at show in Dana Point)
"Love in an Elevator"
"Cryin'"
"S.O.S. (Too Bad)" (only performed at shows in George and Denver; “Pink” performed in this slot at the show in Dana Point)
"Livin' on the Edge"
"Monkey on My Back" (not performed at shows after Las Vegas)
"Kings and Queens" (not performed at show in Dana Point)
"Toys in the Attic"
"Pink" (only performed at the show in The Woodlands) or "Jaded" (only performed at the shows in Atlanta, Atlantic City, Newark, Bristow, and Clarkston)
"Rag Doll"
"Freedom Fighter" (replaced with "Stop Messin' Around" at shows after Inglewood)
"Big Ten Inch Record" or "Same Old Song and Dance" (neither were performed at shows in Newark, Bristow, or Clarkston; both “Jaded” and “Same Old Song and Dance” performed back-to-back in this slot at show in Dana Point)
"Rats in the Cellar" (replaced with "Lord of the Thighs" at shows after Tinley Park; replaced with “Janie's Got a Gun” at show in Dana Point; replaced with "Mama Kin" at shows after Denver; "Mama Kin" replaced with "Movin' Out" and "Walkin' the Dog" at show in Atlantic City; "Mama Kin" was performed with Slash at the shows in Newark and Clarkston)
"I Don't Want to Miss a Thing"
"No More No More" (not performed at show in Dana Point)
"Dude (Looks Like a Lady)" (replaced with "Come Together" at shows in Atlantic City, Newark, Bristow, and Clarkston)
"Walk This Way"
Encore
"Dream On" (Encore)
"Sweet Emotion" (Encore)

At the show in Wantagh, "Monkey on My Back" was not performed, while "Chip Away the Stone" was performed after "No More No More" and before "Dude (Looks Like a Lady)"
At the show in Mansfield, both "Freedom Fighter" and "Stop Messin' Around" were performed back-to-back, followed by "Mama Kin" (with Slash).  "Train Kept A-Rollin'" (with Johnny Depp) was added as a final encore after "Sweet Emotion"
At the show in Stateline, "Pink", "Jaded", and "Janie's Got a Gun" were added, while "Eat the Rich", "Monkey on My Back" and "No More No More" were dropped
Before "Dream On", Steven Tyler performs a snippet of "Home Tonight" or "Darkness" (at the show in Newark, a snippet of "Mia" was also performed, in addition to a snippet of "Home Tonight")

Notes
Slash joined Aerosmith on stage for "Mama Kin" at the shows in Mansfield, Newark, and Clarkston
Also at the Mansfield show, actor Johnny Depp joined the band on stage for a performance of "Train Kept A-Rollin'"
Aerosmith played a private show in Dana Point, California on August 5 for Allstate
The concert in Concord on August 13 was canceled due to problems with Joey Kramer's health
Joey Kramer's son Jesse filled in for his father on the August 16th date in George, Washington and the August 19th date in Denver, Colorado, with Joey returning to play for the encore songs on August 19
After being challenged by Mötley Crüe, Aerosmith participated in the Ice Bucket Challenge at the end of their performance in The Woodlands
The entire show in Clarkston was broadcast live on Yahoo!
At the show in Clarkston, Slash presented a cake and Steven Tyler led the audience in singing "Happy Birthday" in honor of Joe Perry's 64th birthday the following day

Personnel
Aerosmith
Steven Tyler – lead vocals, harmonica, percussion
Joe Perry – guitar, backing vocals, lap pedal steel, talkbox
Brad Whitford – guitar
Tom Hamilton – bass, additional backing vocals on Love in an Elevator and Dude Looks Like A Lady
Joey Kramer – drums, percussion
Additional musicians
Buck Johnson – keyboards, backing vocals
Jesse Sky Kramer – drums, percussion (on August 16 and 19)

References

2014 concert tours
Aerosmith concert tours
Slash (musician) concert tours